Lisui Town is a town situated on the southern portion of Shunyi District, Beijing. It shares border with Nancai Town to the north, Yang and Beiwu Towns to the east, Yanjiao Town to the south, Liqiao and Renhe Towns to the west. It had 22,538 people under its administration in 2020.

The town can be traced back to the Liao dynasty, and its name Lisui came from large amount of residents having the surname Li, and its location near the Baisui River (now known as Bai River).

History

Administrative divisions 
As of 2021, Lisui Town covered the 16 following villages:

See also 

 List of township-level divisions of Beijing

References 

Towns in Beijing
Shunyi District